Franciscus J.M. Heylaerts  (1831–1916) was a Dutch entomologist who specialised in Lepidoptera (most notably Psychidae world species) and Coleoptera. By profession he was a physician. His collection of Psychidae is held by Rijksmuseum Natural History, Leiden.

Works
partial list
Heylaerts F. J. M. 1881. Essai d'une monographie des Psychidae de la faune européenne. Bulletin de la Société entomologique de Belgique 25:29–73.
Heylaerts J. F. M., 1884a. Observations synonymiques et autres relatives à des Psychides, avec descriptions de novae species.Annales de la Société entomologique de Belgique 28(): 34–41.
Heylaerts J. F. M., 1884b.  Fourreau inédit et chenille de psychide de l'Afrique méridionale. Eumeta ? Zelleri m. Comptes rendus de la Société entomologique de Belgique 28(): xcviii–xcix.
Heylaerts J. F. M., 1884 On the exotic Psychids in the Leyden Museum.Notes from the Leyden Museum 6(): 129–133.
Heylaerts J. F. M., 1888. Une Psychide inédite de l'Afrique. Bulletin de la Société entomologique de Belgique 32(): lix–lx.
Heylaerts J. F. M., 1890 Notes psychidologiques. Bulletin de la Société entomologique de Belgique 34(): cxxx–cxxxiii.
 Heylaerts J. F. M., 1890 Trois Psychides inédites de l'Afrique orientale méridionale. Bulletin de la Société entomologique de Belgique 34(): clxxx–clxxxiii.
Heylaerts J. F. M., 1891. Deux espèces nouvelles et un genre nouveau de Lépidoptères africans. Bulletin de la Société entomologique de Belgique 35(): ccclxxiv–ccclxxvi.
 Heylaerts J. F. M., 1906. Remarques sur quelques Psychides. Annales de la Société entomologique de Belgique 50(): 97–100.
Heylaerts F. J. M.1891 Heterocera exotica, nouveaux genre et espèces des indes orientales neerlandaises C. R. Soc. Ent. Belge 35 : ccccix–ccccxvii,[409–417]

References 
Groll, E. K. 2017: Biographies of the Entomologists of the World. – Online database, version 8, Senckenberg Deutsches Entomologisches Institut, Müncheberg – URL: sdei.senckenberg.de/biografies
Anon 2015 Die historische Portaitsammlung der Lepidoptera-Sammlung im Naturhistorischen Museum Wien 37-238, 12291, pp. 113
Huijbregts, H. 1999: [Heylaerts, F. J. M.] Everts, Info, Suppl. 43, S. 44, B15: Sep.

1916 deaths
1831 births
Dutch lepidopterists